Carter Lang is an American producer, songwriter, and musician, best known for his work on SZA's acclaimed 2017 album Ctrl, as well as his contributions to Chicago's burgeoning R&B/Hip-Hop scene. Lang has received several Grammy nominations for work on projects from Post Malone, Doja Cat, Lil Nas X, and SZA, and recently signed a publishing deal renewal with Warner Chappell Music.

Lang, trained in classical piano and bass guitar, moved from Chicago to New Orleans to attend Loyola University New Orleans, where he was exposed to a diverse soundscape. After graduating and returning to Chicago, Lang began producing for members of Chicago Hip-Hop collective Savemoney, with whom he grew up with. Lang was subsequently introduced to recording artist SZA in 2015 through mutual friends, becoming a member of her touring band, as well as writing and/or producing 8 records from her 2017 debut album, including hit single "Love Galore".

Production and songwriting credits

Credits are courtesy of Discogs, Tidal, Apple Music, and AllMusic.

Awards and nominations

References

Year of birth missing (living people)
Living people
Loyola University New Orleans alumni
Record producers from Illinois
Songwriters from Illinois
American hip hop record producers
Musicians from Chicago